This article lists temporary speakers and deputy speakers who lead the meeting of the Regional Representative Council of the term before the definitive speaker and deputy speaker for the term is elected.

According to the tradition, since 1950, the position of temporary speakers is held by the youngest and oldest member of the council.

This article also includes the temporary speakers from the Senate of the United States of Indonesia.

Bibliography

References 

Lists of political office-holders in Indonesia